Lepidochrysops lotana, the Lotana blue, is a species of butterfly in the family Lycaenidae. It is endemic to South Africa, where it is only known from two localities in the Limpopo province, the western slope of the Ysterberg and from Moria to Serala Forest in the Wolkberg area.

The wingspan is 42–44 mm for males and 42–46 mm for females. Adults are on wing from September to early November. There is one generation per year.

The larvae probably feed on Becium grandiflorum.

References

Lepidochrysops
Butterflies described in 1962
Endemic butterflies of South Africa
Taxonomy articles created by Polbot